Cohen Island is an island within the borders of the City and Borough of Juneau, Alaska, United States. It is a part of the Channel Islands State Marine Park.

Cohen Island is forested and characterized by cliffs and headlands around its perimeter, lacking any sufficient landing sites.  Black oystercatchers are often seen looking for food in the vicinity of the island.  According to the Juneau State Land Plan, commercial recreation leasing is prohibited on Cohen Island.

It was named by the U.S. National Geodetic Survey and first published on a chart in 1893.  Historian R. N. DeArmond believed Cohen Island was named after a resident of Juneau and Sitka.

References

External links
Images of Cohen Island: , 

Islands of the Alexander Archipelago
Islands of Juneau, Alaska
Islands of Alaska